Rabbi Samuel ben Isaac de Uçeda (Shmuel de Uzeda) was a Jewish commentator and preacher. Born at Safed in the first quarter of the sixteenth century, his name, Uçeda, originally was derived from the town Uceda in the archbishopric of Toledo. He was a pupil of Isaac Luria and Hayyim Vital, with whom he studied kabbalah, and became rabbi and preacher in Safed and, later, in Constantinople.

Works
Samuel was the author of the following works: 
 Iggeret Shemu'el (Iggeret Shmuel), a commentary and supercommentary on the Book of Ruth (published in 1557; together with the text and the commentary of Rashi, Kuru Chesme, 1597; Amsterdam, 1712; Zolkiev, 1800); 
 Leḥem Dim'ah (Lekhem Dim'ah), a commentary on Lamentations, with the text and the commentary of Rashi (Venice, 1600; Amsterdam, 1710, 1715); 
 Midrash Shemu'el (Midrash Shmuel), a detailed commentary on Pirkei Avot, (Venice, 1579, 1585, 1597; Cracow, 1594; Frankfort-on-the-Main, 1713). This work was his chief one, and included references to the commentaries (at that time in manuscript) of Jonah Gerondi, Meïr Abulafia, Samuel ben Meïr, Menahem Me'iri, Samuel ibn Sid, Joseph ibn Nahmias, Baruch ibn Melek, Joseph ibn Susan, Moses Almosnino, and others, most of which have since been printed.

References

  It has the following bibliography:
 Conforte, Ḳore ha-Dorot, pp. 42a, 48a;
 Azulai, Shem ha-Gedolim, i. 172;
 De Rossi-Hamberger, Hist. Wörterb. p. 254;
 Steinschneider, Cat. Bodl. p. 2494;
 Fürst, Bibl. Jud. iii. 44.W. B. M. K.

Rabbis in Ottoman Galilee
Rabbis in Safed
Kabbalists
Sephardi Jews in Ottoman Palestine
16th-century rabbis from the Ottoman Empire